Ali Gorzan-e Olya (also Romanized as ‘Alī Gorzān-e ‘Olyā; also known as ‘Alī Gordān-e Bālā, ‘Ali Khurdān Bālā, ‘Alī Korzān-e Bālā, and ‘Alī Korzān-e ‘Olyā) is a village in Gamasiyab Rural District, in the Central District of Sahneh County, Kermanshah Province, Iran. At the 2006 census, its population was 656, in 138 families.

References 

Populated places in Sahneh County